Southwind Drum and Bugle Corps  is an Open Class competitive junior drum and bugle corps based in Mobile, Alabama. The corps was a Division I (now World Class) competitive junior drum and bugle corps in Drum Corps International (DCI) from 1993 through 2007. Prior to competing in Division I, Southwind competed in DCI's Class A/Division II and was that division's World Champion in 1991 and 1992. Southwind performed at competitive and non-competitive SoundSport events in Alabama and surrounding states during the summer of 2014. In early May 2015, DCI approved Southwind's return as an active Open Class corps.

History
Sources:

Southwind was founded in 1980 by Michael D. Terry when a group of high school students at Robert E. Lee High School  in Montgomery, Alabama wanted to march in a local drum corps. After setting up a non-profit youth organization and getting a charter as Explorer Post 2009 from the Tuckabatchi Boy Scout Council, Southwind's initial organizational meeting  was held on November 23, 1980 in downtown Montgomery.  Auditions were then held at Robert E Lee High School on December 13, 1980, and, on January 14, 1981, the corps had its first rehearsal.

The corps took its name from the Chicago-to-Miami passenger train "The South Wind" that passed through Montgomery on tracks beside what became the corps' practice field. In 1981, Southwind toured to contests in Alabama, Georgia, Mississippi, Tennessee, and North Carolina before traveling to Philadelphia for the VFW National Drum and Bugle Contest (placing 5th of 8 corps) and then on the DCI World Championships in Montreal, where they finished 39th of 49 corps in Open Class Prelims. The corps undertook an even more extensive tour in 1982, where they placed 5th of 10 corps in the Drum Corps South circuit championships, and made another trip to the DCI World Championships in Montreal, where they were 36th of 49 corps in Open Class Prelims.

Loss of many charter members and debt accrued during the first two seasons caused the corps to go inactive before the start of the 1983 season. From 1983 through 1988, a cadre of supporters continued to raise funds to retire the outstanding debt.

Southwind returned to competition in 1989. The corps toured throughout the South, then traveled to Kansas City, Missouri, where they placed 10th of 23 corps in Class A60 (for corps with no more than 60 members). The corps improved to 4th of 23 corps in Class A60 at Buffalo, New York in 1990.

In 1991, Southwind moved into Class A and was undefeated in 16 contests against only Class A corps and won the DCI Class A World Championship over 18 other corps at Dallas. In 1992, Southwind continued its winning streak in the renamed Division II, placing first in another 16 shows before falling to 3rd place among 18 corps in Division II prelims at Whitewater, Wisconsin before rebounding in finals to claim its second DCI World Championship. In both 1991 and 1992, Southwind finished among the top 25 corps in DCI's Open Class/Division I quarterfinals, earning full membership in the organization.

Southwind moved to competing solely in Division I in 1993 and beyond. For five seasons, the corps placed 17th through 24th at DCI FInals, but was finding it more and more difficult for the small group of local boosters to administer the unit. In the 1997 season, several staff members of the Madison Scouts also worked with Southwind; at the end of the season, corps director Dave Bryan approached the Scouts' management about assuming the sponsorship of Southwind. In 1998, the Madison Drum and Bugle Corps Association, Inc. took over the operation of Southwind. The corps was inactive for that season, as its operations were moved from Montgomery to Lexington, Kentucky.

Returning to the field in 1999, Southwind placed 15th at DCI Championships in Madison, Wisconsin. 2000 was Southwind's best season in Division I, as the corps finished 13th at College Park, Maryland, although the corps scored no worse than 12th in all captions. Southwind finished 15th at Buffalo in 2001 and 18th at Madison in 2002. In reorganizing its house after a disappointing season, the Madison Drum and Bugle Corps Association severed its ties with Southwind.

Back on its own, Southwind formed the Bluegrass Youth Performance Corporation as a sponsoring organization. The corps continued as a large, well-respected, but second-tier, Division I corps through 2007, when economic conditions led the corps to another period of inactivity.

In 2011, Southwind Drum & Bugle Corps came under the control of Southwind Alumni Association, Inc.  2011 through 2013 were rebuilding years for the organization as they raised funds and sought sponsorships for returning the corps to competition. The corps also returned to the Mobile area.

In November and December 2013, Southwind held its first recruitment and audition camps since leaving the field in 2007. In 2014, the organization fielded a 50-member SoundSport team and performing in exhibition at some DCI shows as a route to reentering DCI competition in 2015.

In early May 2015, DCI approved Southwind's return as an active Open Class corps and placed the corps on the summer schedule for five shows in Alabama, Georgia, and Mississippi. After competing in six contests in 2016, the 2017 corps entered a dozen contests in eight states, including a return to DCI Open Class Championships and DCI World Championships for the first time since 2007.

Sponsorship
Southwind Drum and Bugle Corps is sponsored by the Southwind Alumni Association, Inc., a 501 (c)(3) musical organization.  Ernad Sisic is the corps director.

Show summary (1981–2023)
Sources:

References

External links
Official website

Musical groups established in 1980
1980 establishments in Alabama
Mobile, Alabama